Scaptius obscurata is a moth in the family Erebidae. It was described by William Schaus in 1920. It is found in Guatemala.

References

Moths described in 1920
Phaegopterina
Arctiinae of South America